Chrysopilus laetus  is a Palearctic species of  snipe fly in the family Rhagionidae.

References

Rhagionidae
Insects described in 1842
Taxa named by Johan Wilhelm Zetterstedt
Diptera of Europe